Kalonymus Ben Meshullam was a French Jew of the Kalonymos family.

He was head of the Jewish community of Mainz at the time of the Rhineland massacres. He is said to have sent a messenger to King Henry IV in Italy, in consequence of which the king promulgated an order throughout his realm to the effect that the Jews were not to be molested. On 27 May 1096, however, Kalonymus led fifty-three other Jews, who had taken refuge in the palace of Bishop Adalbert of Worms from the Crusaders, to meet the invaders in battle (led by Count Emicho) during the Worms massacre.

References

Year of birth unknown
1096 deaths
Hellenistic Jews
11th-century French Jews
Jewish martyrs
Politicians from Mainz